Catherine McLeod (July 2, 1921 – May 11, 1997) was an American actress who made over 60 television and movie appearances between 1944 and 1976. She memorably portrayed the one woman whom James Garner's character Bret Maverick wanted to marry on the 1957 ABC/Warner Brothers television series Maverick, in the episode "Rage for Vengeance."

Early years
McLeod was born in Santa Monica, California. Her schooling came in an Alhambra convent. She acted in a Los Angeles little theater and studied in the Bliss-Hayden drama workshop. She worked in a movie theater in Reno and later became a chorus girl in musicals.

Cinema
MacLeod's films included the leading role as a concert pianist in Frank Borzage's I've Always Loved You (1946), Courage of Lassie (1946), The Fabulous Texan (1947), Borzage's That's My Man (1947),  Old Los Angeles (1948), My Wife's Best Friend (1952), A Blueprint for Murder (1953), William Witney's The Outcast (1954), Ride the Wild Surf (1964), and Lipstick (1976).

Television
On October 10, 1950, McLeod starred in "Criminal's Mark" on the TV version of Suspense. She made two guest appearances on the television series Perry Mason: Lorraine Ferrell in "The Case of the Vagabond Vixen" (1957) and Nora Huxley in "The Case of the Glittering Goldfish" (1959). In both roles, she played the wife of the murder victim, but was neither the defendant nor actual murderer.

McLeod appeared in dozens of other series, including The Millionaire, Meet McGraw, Richard Diamond, Private Detective, Maverick with James Garner in the episode "A Rage for Vengeance," 77 Sunset Strip, Mickey Spillane's Mike Hammer, Bronco, Colt .45, Lawman (in the 1961 episode "The Prodigal Mother," with child actor Billy Booth), Bonanza, Hazel, Hawaiian Eye, Have Gun - Will Travel, The Outer Limits, The Virginian, Gunsmoke (as “Letty Rickers”, an abused wife of a homesteader turned cowardly killer in S2E29’s “Wrong Man” - played by her real-life husband Don Keefer), and the "Ten Thousand Horses Singing" episode of Studio One opposite James Dean and John Forsythe.

McLeod's greatest impact upon American consciousness by far, however, was as purveyor of one of the most ubiquitous catchphrases of its era when she portrayed the woman in the 1963 headache remedy Anacin television commercial, who plaintively but irritably said, "Mother, please!  I'd rather do it myself!" The announcer's voiceover would then intone, "Sure you have a headache... tense, irritable.... but don't take it out on her."

Personal life
McLeod married Bill Gerds (January 30, 1947 - 1949) (divorced), who was then a dental student in San Francisco. They eloped to Reno on January 3, 1947. McLeod's second husband was actor Don Keefer, 7 May 1950 until her death on 11 May 1997 having three children together.

Radio appearances

Filmography

References

Sources
 Ten Thousand Horses Singing at Internet Movie Database
 Rage for Vengeance at Internet Movie Database

External links

 

1921 births
American film actresses
American television actresses
1997 deaths
20th-century American actresses
Actresses from Los Angeles